Brendan Byrne Arena, New Jersey 1984 is a live album by Bruce Springsteen & the E Street Band, released in May 2015 and was the fifth official release through the Bruce Springsteen Archives. The show was originally recorded live at the Brendan Byrne Arena in East Rutherford, New Jersey on August 5, 1984.

Background
The release is the first officially released complete recording from Bruce Springsteen's historic Born in the USA Tour. This was the E Street Band's first tour with Nils Lofgren on guitar (Steven Van Zandt had left the band) and Patti Scialfa on vocals and percussion.

Track listing
All songs by Bruce Springsteen, except as noted.

Set One
"Born in the USA" - 5:42
"Out in the Street" - 5:19
"Tenth Avenue Freeze-Out" - 5:00
"Atlantic City" - 5:13
"Johnny 99" - 4:30
"Highway Patrolman" - 6:25
"Prove It All Night" - 6:26
"Glory Days" - 10:16
"The Promised Land" - 6:28
"Used Cars" - 6:16
"My Hometown" - 6:01
"Badlands" - 5:28
"Thunder Road" - 6:47

Set Two
"Hungry Heart" - 5:07
"Dancing in the Dark" - 5:47
"Cadillac Ranch" - 5:14
"Sherry Darling" - 5:55
"No Surrender" - 5:35
"Pink Cadillac" - 6:53
"Growin' Up" - 8:56
"Bobby Jean" - 4:10
"Backstreets - 10:30
"Rosalita (Come Out Tonight)" - 17:05

First Encore
"Jersey Girl" - 5:37 (Tom Waits)
"Jungleland" - 12:38

Second Encore
"Born to Run" - 4:43
"Detroit Medley" - 4:05
"Devil With a Blue Dress On" (Stevenson/Long) 
"See See Rider" (Rainey/Arant) 
"Good Golly Miss Molly" (Blackwell/Marascalco) 
"Jenny Take a Ride" (Crewe/Johnson/Penniman) 
"Travelin' Band" - 5:03 (John Fogerty)
"Twist and Shout" - 8:41 (Phil Medley, Bert Berns)

Personnel
 Bruce Springsteen - lead vocals, guitars, harmonica
 Clarence Clemons – saxophone, congas, percussion, background vocals
 Garry Tallent – bass guitar
 Danny Federici – organ, glockenspiel, piano, synthesizer
 Roy Bittan – piano, synthesizer, background vocals
 Max Weinberg – drums
 Nils Lofgren – guitars, background vocals
 Patti Scialfa - background vocals, synthesizer, tambourine

References

2015 live albums
Bruce Springsteen Archives